Capella is a lunar impact crater  in diameter that lies to the north of the Mare Nectaris, in a rugged region with many small impact craters. It was named after Roman astronomer Martianus Capella. It intrudes slightly into the eastern rim of the crater Isidorus, a feature only slightly smaller in diameter.

The wall of Capella is low but relatively thick and irregular, with a large promontory intruding on the south-eastern side. The crater is crossed by a deep rift, the Vallis Capella, which passes directly through Capella from the north rim through the southeast side of the wall, and extends out both sides for a combined distance of 110 kilometers. This feature was formed by a chain of craters. In the middle of the crater is a wide, round peak with a craterlet at the top. The western side of the crater is dotted with impact debris, forming clusters of small hills.

Satellite craters
By convention these features are identified on lunar maps by placing the letter on the side of the crater midpoint that is closest to Capella.

References

External links

 Lunar Photo of the Day, "Land of Manna", October 5, 2006, showing the region around Capella and discussing Capella Valley

Impact craters on the Moon